The Brothers of Christian Instruction (F.I.C.P.), commonly known as the La Mennais Brothers, is a Catholic educational organization founded in 1819 by Gabriel Deshayes and Jean-Marie de la Mennais for the instruction of youth. Their aim remains that of their Founder: "to educate the young and to make Jesus Christ better known and better loved".

The brothers are bound by the simple vows of poverty, chastity, and obedience.

History 
On June 16, 1819, Gabriel Deshayes, pastor at Auray and vicar general of Vannes, and Jean-Marie de Lamennais, vicar of Saint-Brieuc, two Catholic priests in France, established the Daughters of Providence and the Brothers of Christian Instruction.

The first brothers took their novitiates with the Christian Brothers, whose rule was to a large extent adopted. The organization dedicated itself to promoting education among the working class in France and, eventually, across the world. The motherhouse was established at Ploërmel in November 1824. In 1876, the Brothers of Gascony, founded by Bishop de la Croix d’Azolette, then Archbishop of Auch, and in 1880, the Brothers of Sainte-Marie de Tinchebray, founded by Father Charles-Augustin Duguey, subsumed themselves within the Brothers of Ploërmel.

The Brothers received canonical approval by Pope Leo XIII on March 13, 1891.

From the motherhouse at Ploërmel, the brothers founded sites in England, Africa, Asia, North America, and Oceania. In 1886 the first brothers arrived in Montreal and were shortly afterwards introduced into the United States. To escape the effects of a 1901 French law curtailing certain kinds of religious schooling, the motherhouse was transferred to Taunton, England. In 1903, following through on the strict secularism of the 1901 law, the French government dissolved the brotherhood's French presence and confiscated its properties. At the same time, they established a presence in Bulgaria, Turkey, and Egypt.

The Brothers of Christian Instruction grew, extending their mission to the Philippines and Spain, and expanding it in the United Kingdom. In 2015, 1,300 members of the Brothers of Christian Instruction were spread across 25 countries.

Institutions
 Collège Jean de la Mennais
 St. Francis Xavier's College (Liverpool)
 St. John Fisher Ibanda Secondary School
 St Mary's Independent School, Southampton
 St. Mary's International School
 Walsh University
 Institution Saint-Louis de Gonzague in Delmas, Haiti
 St. Charles Lwanga Secondary School, Kasasa in Masaka, Uganda
 St. Henry's College Kitovu in Masaka, Uganda
 St. Mary's College, Kisubi in Wakiso, Uganda
 St. Mary's Duluti Secondary School, Arusha
Seiko Gakuin Junior and Senior High School

See also
 Pell Wall Hall
 Cheswardine
 Consecrated life

References

External links

Official Website of the Le Mennais Brothers
Brothers of Christian Instruction at the New Advent Catholic Encyclopedia
St Edward's College, Cheswardine - former juniorate of the Brothers of Christian Instruction

Religious organizations established in 1819
1819 establishments in France
Catholic religious institutes established in the 19th century